Hopes and Fears is the debut album by the English avant-rock group Art Bears. It comprises tracks by Henry Cow, Art Bears's predecessor, recorded at Sunrise Studios, Kirchberg in Switzerland in January 1978, and tracks by Art Bears, recorded at Kaleidophon Studios in London in March 1978.

Background
Hopes and Fears began as a Henry Cow album, but after the first recording sessions in Switzerland, some of the members of the band were unhappy about the predominance of song-oriented material. As a compromise it was agreed that two albums would be made: the songs would be released by Fred Frith, Chris Cutler and Dagmar Krause as Art Bears, and the instrumental compositions would be released later by Henry Cow. The newly formed Art Bears recorded four more tracks in London to complete Hopes and Fears, which was released in May 1978. Henry Cow returned to Switzerland in July that year to record additional instrumental pieces for what was to be their last album, Western Culture (1979).

Henry Cow bassist Georgie Born tweeted in 2021, "Time the myths around Hopes and Fears ended: it was a Henry Cow album but arguments among the boys meant it ended up as 'Art Bears': wrong, unjust, writes Lindsay [Cooper], Tim Hodgkinson and I out of the creative process."

Description
Because of Henry Cow's presence on this album, Hopes and Fears is considered by some to be "the lost Henry Cow album". But the predominance of songs makes the album a bridge between Henry Cow and Art Bears, a move away from Henry Cow's usual intense compositions, and the beginnings of Art Bears's music, fully realised on their next two albums. It also shows Frith experimenting with eastern European folk music on "Moeris Dancing", which he explored further on some of his subsequent solo albums, particularly Gravity (1980) and Speechless (1981).

"Joan" and "On Suicide" had been performed live by Henry Cow in 1977 and appear on Volume 7: Later and Post-Virgin of The 40th Anniversary Henry Cow Box Set (2009). This version of "Joan" differs from the earlier live recording in that it is shorter, and the lyrics are different. Cutler wrote the original lyrics for "Joan" and Tim Hodgkinson's "The Pirate Song", but Henry Cow were unhappy with them, and the songs were withdrawn from their repertoire. "Joan" was only performed a few times, and "The Pirate Song" not at all. Prior to the Hopes and Fears recording session, Cutler rewrote the lyrics for "Joan" as a homage to Joan of Arc, and those for "The Pirate Song", but once again there were objections from the feminist faction within Henry Cow. Krause, however, supported the new lyrics and both songs were recorded at Sunrise Studios with the revised texts.

Stewart Mason wrote at AllMusic that the album's longest track, "In Two Minds" is the closest Art Bears came to playing "conventional rock music". When Cutler was asked in an interview in 2004 whether the song was a "homage" to the Who, he replied, "It would be hard to deny the connection. It is so obviously a reference. I was certainly directly influenced in my youth by The Who – and in particular by Keith Moon."

Album title
Hopes and Fears derived its name from the following conversation between Charion and Hermes in Satirical Sketches: Charon Sees Life by Lucian of Samosata (quoted in the booklet accompanying the CD release of the album):

{| class="wikitable" style="width: 80%;"
|-valign="top"
! Charion
| All I can see is a complicated muddle – a world full of utter confusion. Their towers are like beehives in which every bee has a sting of his own and uses it against his neighbour – and some are like wasps, preying on the weaker members of the community. But what are those dim shapes flying around them?
|-valign="top"
! Hermes
| Hopes and Fears, Charon...
|}

CD reissues
Hopes and Fears was reissued on CD in 1992 by Recommended Records with three extra tracks.
The album was also reissued in 2004 in The Art Box, a 6xCD box set of all Art Bears releases with live and unreleased tracks, plus remixes by other musicians.

Track listing
Recorded by Henry Cow at Sunrise Studio, Kirchberg, Switzerland, 15–29 January 1978; and by Art Bears at Kaleidophon, London, 15–18 March 1978.

Bonus track notes
Track 14 from the B-side of the Art Bears 7" single "Rats & Monkeys" (1979) – recorded at Kaleidophon Studios, London, Winter 1979.
Track 15 from Recommended Records Sampler (1982) – recorded at Kaleidophon Studios, London, Winter 1979.
Track 16 from a 7" single given free to subscribers of The World as It Is Today (1981) – a coda to the Art Bears track "Man and Boy" from Winter Songs (1979), recorded live at Cantù, Italy, 30 May 1979.
"Collapse" and "All Hail!" are inverted in the CD liner notes.

Personnel
Fred Frith – guitars, violin, viola, harmonium, xylophone, piano, bass guitar on "Terrain" and "The Tube"
Chris Cutler – drums, percussion, noise
Dagmar Krause – voice

Guests (from Henry Cow)
Tim Hodgkinson – organ, clarinet, piano on "The Pirate Song"
Lindsay Cooper – bassoon, oboe, soprano, recorder
Georgie Born – bass guitar, cello, vocals on "Maze"

Additional personnel
Peter Blegvad – bass guitar on "Coda to Man and Boy"
Marc Hollander – piano on "Coda to Man and Boy"

Sound and art work
Produced by Art Bears and Etienne Conod
Cover art by E. M. Thomas, assisted by Graham Keatley, Charlotte Sainsbury, Doug Kierdorf and Jane Colling (figures on the original LP cover)

References

Works cited

1978 debut albums
Art Bears albums
Recommended Records albums